Khunda, or Kunda, is a village and Union Council of Swabi District, in Khyber Pakhtunkhwa. It is part of Lahor Tehsil and is located at 34°3'0"N 72°26'0"E.

References 

Populated places in Swabi District
Union Councils of Swabi District